Shocking Pinks is a self-titled album by the band of the same name. It is a remastered merging of the band's two previous records, Mathematical Warfare and Infinity Land, which were originally released on New Zealand record label Flying Nun Records.

Track listing
"Wake Up"
"This Aching Deal"
"How Am I Not Myself?"
"Second Hand Girl"
"End of the World"
"The Narrator"
"Yes! No!"
"Emily"
"Blonde Haired Girl"
"Victims"
"Girl on the Northern Line"
"I Want U Back"
"SmokeScreen"
"Jealousy"
"Cutout"
"23"
"You Can Make Me Feel Bad"

2007 albums
Shocking Pinks albums
DFA Records albums